Arbee may refer to:
 Arbee (automobile), a short-lived English automobile manufactured in 1904
 Arbee Stidham (1917–1988), an American R&B singer and multi-instrumentalist
 Arbee (song), a composition by Howard McGhee